Anna Ruby Falls is located near Unicoi State Park in White County near Helen, Georgia.  The waterfall is accessible via a half mile (800 m) paved trail from a public use area with a small admittance charge.  The Anna Ruby Falls Trail is designated a National Recreation Trail in Georgia.

Anna Ruby Falls is actually twin waterfalls created where two separate streams- Curtis Creek and York Creek- join at the base of the falls to form Smith Creek, which flows into Unicoi Lake.  Both Curtis and York creeks begin on Tray Mountain, Georgia's sixth-highest peak: Curtis Creek drops  and York Creek drops . The falls are named after Anna Ruby Nichols, the daughter of an early settler.

The Anna Ruby Falls Scenic Area is a  area around Anna Ruby Falls and is part of the Chattahoochee National Forest, though access is only through Unicoi State Park.  The U.S. Forest Service leases it to the non-profit Cradle of Forestry. The Cradle of Forestry accepts the "Golden Age" pass allowing seniors in free, with pass.  There is an entry fee for the parking area, and a Georgia ParkPass (required for parking at Unicoi) is not honored, as it is on federal land rather than state.

Anna Ruby Falls is one of four popular waterfalls located in the Forest near Helen, Georgia.  Two of the other water falls, Dukes Creek Falls and Raven Cliff Falls, are also in White County, while the third waterfall, DeSoto Falls, is in neighboring Lumpkin County

See also
Waterfalls of North Georgia
Ruby Falls, an underground waterfall under Lookout Mountain in Tennessee that bears a similar name

References

External links

Anna Ruby Falls Virtual Tour
Photo of Anna Ruby Falls
Georgia Trails - Anna Ruby Falls
Visiting Anna Ruby Falls
History of Anna Ruby Falls (video)

Waterfalls of Georgia (U.S. state)
Protected areas of White County, Georgia
Landforms of White County, Georgia